The 1974 United States House of Representatives elections in Texas occurred on November 5, 1974, to elect the members of the state of Texas's delegation to the United States House of Representatives. Texas had twenty-four seats in the House apportioned according to the 1970 United States Census.

Texas underwent mid-decade redistricting as a result of the U.S. Supreme Court case White v. Weiser. A District Court had ruled the legislature's districts unconstitutional due to their average population deviation of 0.745%, which violated the one man, one vote principle established by Wesberry v. Sanders. The District Court had also ruled against the Texas Legislature's incumbency protection justification for the district's deviation, but this ruling was not held upon appeal to the Supreme Court. The Supreme Court placed the lower court in charge of redrawing the map, which it did in time for the 1974 elections.

These elections occurred simultaneously with the United States Senate elections of 1974, the United States House elections in other states, and various state and local elections.

Democrats maintained their majority of U.S. House seats from Texas, gaining one seat from the Republicans, increasing their majority to twenty-one out of twenty-four seats.

Overview

Congressional Districts

District 1 
Incumbent Democrat Wright Patman, the Dean of the House, ran for re-election.

District 2 
Incumbent Democrat Charlie Wilson ran for re-election unopposed.

District 3 
Incumbent Republican James M. Collins ran for re-election.

District 4 
Incumbent Democrat Ray Roberts ran for re-election.

District 5 
Incumbent Republican Alan Steelman ran for re-election.

District 6 
Incumbent Democrat Olin E. Teague ran for re-election.

District 7 
Incumbent Republican Bill Archer ran for re-election.

District 8 
Incumbent Democrat Bob Eckhardt ran for re-election.

District 9 
Incumbent Democrat Jack Brooks ran for re-election.

District 10 
Incumbent Democrat J. J. Pickle ran for re-election.

District 11 
Incumbent Democrat William R. Poage ran for re-election.

District 12 
Incumbent Democrat Jim Wright ran for re-election.

District 13 
Incumbent Republican Bob Price ran for re-election.

District 14 
Incumbent Democrat John Andrew Young ran for re-election unopposed.

District 15 
Incumbent Democrat Kika de la Garza ran for re-election unopposed.

District 16 
Incumbent Democrat Richard Crawford White ran for re-election unopposed.

District 17 
Incumbent Democrat Omar Burleson ran for re-election unopposed.

District 18 
Incumbent Democrat Barbara Jordan ran for re-election.

District 19 
Incumbent Democrat George H. Mahon ran for re-election unopposed.

District 20 
Incumbent Democrat Henry B. González ran for re-election unopposed.

District 21 
Incumbent Democrat O. C. Fisher opted to retire rather than run for re-election.

District 22 
Incumbent Democrat Robert R. Casey ran for re-election.

District 23 
Incumbent Democrat Abraham Kazen ran for re-election unopposed.

District 24 
Incumbent Democrat Dale Milford ran for re-election.

References

1974
Texas
United States House of Representatives